Navarasam Matriculation Higher Secondary School is located in the village of Palliyithu, Erode, Tamil Nadu, India. It was established by Navarasam Narpani Kala Mandram, a social welfare trust formed by a group of first generation graduates from agricultural families in the surrounding area. Operational since 1975, the school provides English education for children from rural and agricultural backgrounds.

See also 
 List of Educational Institutions in Erode

References 

High schools and secondary schools in Tamil Nadu
Schools in Erode district
Education in Erode
Educational institutions established in 1978
1978 establishments in Tamil Nadu